The Geneva Bible (GNV) is one of the most historically significant translations of the Bible into English, preceding the King James Version by 51 years.  It was the primary Bible of 16th-century English Protestantism and was used by William Shakespeare, Oliver Cromwell, John Knox, John Donne, and others. It was one of the Bibles taken to America on the Mayflower (Pilgrim Hall Museum has collected several Bibles of Mayflower passengers). The Geneva Bible was used by many English Dissenters, and it was still respected by Oliver Cromwell's soldiers at the time of the English Civil War, in the booklet The Souldiers Pocket Bible.

This version of the Bible is significant because, for the first time, a mechanically printed, mass-produced Bible was made available directly to the general public which came with a variety of scriptural study guides and aids (collectively called an apparatus), which included verse citations that allow the reader to cross-reference one verse with numerous relevant verses in the rest of the Bible, introductions to each book of the Bible that acted to summarize all of the material that each book would cover, maps, tables, woodcut illustrations and indices.

Because the language of the Geneva Bible was more forceful and vigorous, most readers strongly preferred this version to the Great Bible. In the words of Cleland Boyd McAfee, "it drove the Great Bible off the field by sheer power of excellence".

History
The Geneva Bible followed the Great Bible of 1539, the first authorised Bible in English, which was the authorized Bible of the Church of England.

During the reign of Queen Mary I of England (1553–58), because Mary I was Catholic, a number of Protestant scholars fled from England to Geneva, Switzerland, which was then ruled as a republic in which John Calvin and, later, Theodore Beza, provided the primary spiritual and theological leadership.  Among these scholars was William Whittingham, who supervised the translation now known as the Geneva Bible, in collaboration with Myles Coverdale, Christopher Goodman, Anthony Gilby, Thomas Sampson, and William Cole; several of this group later became prominent figures in the Vestments controversy. Whittingham was directly responsible for the New Testament, which was complete and published in 1557, while Gilby oversaw the Old Testament.

The first full edition of this Bible, with a further revised New Testament, appeared in 1560, and was published by Sir Rowland Hill of Soulton, but it was not printed in England until 1575 (New Testament) and 1576 (complete Bible). Over 150 editions were issued; the last probably in 1644. The first Bible printed in Scotland was a Geneva Bible, which was first issued in 1579. In fact, the involvement of Knox (1514-1572) and Calvin (1509-1564) in the creation of the Geneva Bible made it especially appealing in Scotland, where a law was passed in 1579 requiring every household of sufficient means to buy a copy.

Some editions from 1576 onwards included Laurence Tomson's revisions of the New Testament. Some editions from 1599 onwards used a new "Junius" version of the Book of Revelation, in which the notes were translated from a new Latin commentary by Franciscus Junius.

The annotations which are an important part of the Geneva Bible were Calvinist and Puritan in character, and as such they were disliked by the ruling pro-government Anglicans of the Church of England, as well as King James I, who commissioned the "Authorized Version", or King James Bible, in order to replace it. The Geneva Bible had also motivated the earlier production of the Bishops' Bible under Elizabeth I, for the same reason, and the later Rheims–Douai edition by the Catholic community. The Geneva Bible remained popular among Puritans and remained in widespread use until after the English Civil War. The Geneva notes were surprisingly included in a few editions of the King James version, even as late as 1715.

Translation and Format
The Geneva Bible was the first English version to be translated entirely from the original languages of Hebrew, Aramaic, and Greek. Though the text is principally just a revision of William Tyndale's earlier work of 1534, Tyndale only translated the New Testament and the Old Testament through 2 Chronicles before he was imprisoned. The English refugees living in Geneva completed the translation of the Old Testament from Hebrew to English for the first time. The work was led by William Whittingham.

Textual Basis 
The Geneva Bible was translated from scholarly editions of the Greek New Testament and the Hebrew Scriptures that comprise the Old Testament. The English rendering was substantially based on the earlier translations by William Tyndale and Myles Coverdale (the Genevan Bible relies significantly upon Tyndale). However, the Geneva Bible was the first English version in which all of the Old Testament was translated directly from the Hebrew (cf. Coverdale Bible, Matthew Bible).

Format

Chapter and verse divisions 
The Geneva Bible was the first English Bible to use verse numbers based on the work of Stephanus (Robert Estienne of Paris, by this point living in Geneva).

Style of Type 
The 1560 Geneva Bible was printed in Roman type—the style of type regularly used today—but many editions used the older black-letter ("Gothic") type. Of the various later English Bible translations, the next to use Roman type was the Douay–Rheims Bible of 1582 (New Testament) and 1609–1610 (Old Testament).

Marginal notes 
It also had an elaborate system of commentary in marginal glosses. This annotation was done by Laurence Tomson, who translated (for the 1560 Geneva Bible) L'Oiseleur's notes on the Gospels, which themselves came from Camerarius. In 1576 Tomson added L'Oiseleur's notes for the Epistles, which came from Beza's Greek and Latin edition of the Bible (1565 and later). Beginning in 1599 Franciscus Junius' notes on Revelation were added, replacing the original notes deriving from John Bale and Heinrich Bullinger.  Bale's The Image of both churches had a great effect on these notes as well as Foxe's Book of Martyrs.  Both the Junius and Bullinger-Bale annotations are explicitly anti-Roman Catholic and representative of Protestant apocalypticism during the Reformation.

Size 

The Geneva Bible was also issued in more convenient and affordable sizes than earlier versions. The 1560 Bible was in quarto format (218 × 139 mm type area), but pocketable octavo editions were also issued, and a few large folio editions. The New Testament was issued at various times in sizes from quarto down to 32º (the smallest, 70×39 mm type area). In the late 16th century it is likely that the Geneva New Testament cost less than a week's wages even for the lowest-paid labourers.

Illustrations 
The 1560 Geneva Bible contained a number of study aids, including woodcut illustrations, maps and explanatory 'tables', i.e. indexes of names and topics, in addition to the famous marginal notes.  Each book was preceded by an 'argument' or introduction, and each chapter by a list of contents giving verse numbers. Smaller-format editions might be unillustrated and lack the marginal notes, but some large folio editions had additional illustrations, such as one showing Adam and Eve, where Adam wears a typical Elizabethan beard and moustache.

Breeches Bible
The Geneva Bible received the nickname "Breeches Bible," based on its unique translation of Genesis Chapter 3, Verse 7. The text reads: "Then the eies of them both were opened, and they knew that they were naked, and they sewed figge tree leaves together, and made themselves breeches." Previous English Bibles, such as the 1530 Pentateuch translation of William Tyndale, the 1535 Coverdale Bible, and the 1539 Great Bible, used the word apurns/aprons in this place. In the King James Version of 1611, "breeches" was changed to "aprons".

Here are both the Geneva, Tyndale and the King James versions of Genesis 3:7 with spellings as in their originals (not modernized):

King James I and the Geneva Bible

King James I's distaste for the Geneva Bible was apparently not necessarily caused just by the translation of the text into English, but mostly the annotations in the margins. He felt strongly many of the annotations were "very partial, untrue, seditious, and savoring too much of dangerous and traitorous conceits". In all likelihood, he saw the Geneva's interpretations of some biblical passages as anti-clerical "republicanism", which could imply church hierarchy was unnecessary. Other passages appeared particularly seditious: notably, references to monarchs as "tyrants".

Example of the commentary in conflict with the monarchy in the Geneva Bible (modern spelling) include:

 Daniel 6:22 — “For he [Daniel] disobeyed the king’s wicked commandment in order to obey God, and so he did no injury to the king, who ought to command nothing by which God would be dishonoured.”
 Daniel 11:36 — “So long the tyrants will prevail as God has appointed to punish his people: but he shows that it is but for a time.”
 Exodus 1:19 — To the Hebrew midwives lying to their leaders, “Their disobedience herein was lawful, but their dissembling evil.”
 2 Chronicles 15:15-17 — King Asa “showed that he lacked zeal, for she should have died both by the covenant and by the law of God, but he gave place to foolish pity and would also seem after a sort to satisfy the law.”

So when towards the end of the conference two Puritans suggested that a new translation of the Bible be produced to better unify the Anglican Church in England and Scotland, James embraced the idea. He would not only be rid of those inconvenient annotations, but have greater influence on the translation of the Bible as a whole. He commissioned and chartered a new translation of the Bible which would eventually become the most famous version of the Bible in the history of the English language. Officially known as the Authorized Version to be read in churches, the new Bible would come to bear his name as the so-called King James Bible or King James Version (KJV) elsewhere or casually. The first and early editions of the King James Bible from 1611 and the first few decades thereafter lack annotations, unlike nearly all editions of the Geneva Bible up until that time. 

Initially, the King James Version did not sell well and competed with the Geneva Bible. Shortly after the first edition of the KJV, King James banned the printing of new editions of the Geneva Bible to further entrench his version. However, Robert Barker continued to print Geneva Bibles even after the ban, placing the spurious date of 1599 on new copies of Genevas which were actually printed between about 1616 and 1625.

Legacy 
Although the King James Version was intended to replace the Geneva Bible, the King James translators relied heavily upon this version. Bruce Metzger, in Theology Today 1960, observes the inevitable reliance the KJV had on the GB. Some estimate that twenty percent of the KJV came directly from the GB. He further revels in the enormous impact the GB had on Protestantism. “In short, it was chiefly owing to the dissemination of copies of the Geneva version of 1560 that a sturdy and articulate Protestantism was created in Britain, a Protestantism which made a permanent impact upon Anglo-American culture.” 

Despite popular misconception, the Puritan Separatists or Pilgrim Fathers aboard the Mayflower in 1620 brought to North America copies of the Geneva Bible.  German historian Leopold von Ranke observed that ‘Calvin was virtually the founder of America.’

Modern spelling version of the 1599 Geneva Bible 
In 2006, Tolle Lege Press released a version of the 1599 Geneva Bible with modernised spelling, as part of their 1599 Geneva Bible restoration project. The original cross references were retained as well as the study notes by the Reformation leaders. In addition, the Early Modern English glossary was included in the updated version. The advisory board of the restoration project included several Protestant Christian leaders and scholars.

See also 
 Bishops' Bible 
 Editio Regia
 King James Version 
 Matthew Bible 
 Tyndale Bible 
 Young's Literal Translation
 Great Bible

References

External links

Text
Geneva Bible (1599)
Geneva Bible Footnotes
Geneva Bible online (1599)
Modern Spelling Geneva Bible with Footnotes for the Gospels
 

Articles
The Geneva Bible of 1560: article by Bruce Metzger originally printed in Theology Today
Online version of Sir Frederic G. Kenyon's article in Hastings' Dictionary of the Bible, 1909

Editions Currently in Print
1560 First Edition: Facsimile Reproduction
1560 First Edition Reduced size Facsimile Reproduction by Hendrickson
1599 Edition: Modern Spelling and Typesetting from The 1599 Geneva Bible Restoration Project (no illustrations)

1557 books
1560 books
Early printed Bibles
English Reformation
History of Christianity in the United Kingdom
History of the Church of England
16th-century Christian texts
Bible translations into English
Reformation in Switzerland
Scottish Reformation
Study Bibles
Church of Scotland